The King's Fianchetto Opening or Benko's Opening (also known as the Hungarian Opening, Barcza Opening, or Bilek Opening) is a chess opening characterized by the move:
1. g3

White's 1.g3 ranks as the fifth most popular opening move, but it is far less popular than 1.e4, 1.d4, 1.c4 and 1.Nf3. It is usually followed by 2.Bg2, fianchettoing the bishop. Nick de Firmian writes that 1.g3 "can, and usually does, transpose into almost any other opening in which White fianchettos his king's bishop". Included among these are the Catalan Opening, the King's Indian Attack and some variations of the English Opening. For this reason, the Encyclopaedia of Chess Openings has no specific code devoted to 1.g3. The move itself is classified under A00, but the numerous transpositional possibilities can result in various ECO codes.

While this opening has never been common, the Madras player Ghulam Kassim, annotating the 1828 correspondence match between Madras and Hyderabad, noted that "many of the Indian players commence their game in this way."<ref>Gulam Kassim, [https://books.google.com/books?id=I_NdAAAAcAAJ Analysis of the Muzio Gambit and Match of Two Games at Chess between Madras and Hyderabad], Madras, 1829</ref> The hypermodern player Richard Reti played 1.g3 several times at Baden-Baden in 1925, with mixed results. 1.g3 received renewed attention after Pal Benko used it to defeat Bobby Fischer and Mikhail Tal in the 1962 Candidates Tournament in Curaçao, part of the 1963 World Championship cycle.  Benko used the opening the first eleven times he was White in the tournament. Viktor Korchnoi employed it once against Anatoly Karpov in the 1978 World Chess Championship, perhaps its most notable use.

Theory
White can also play Nf3 in the future, then castle  to transpose into the King's Indian Attack.

Sample lines
The following lines are examples of the kinds of positions which can develop from the King's Fianchetto opening. Move order is flexible in each case.

King's Indian Attack

King's Indian Attack, Yugoslav Variation (ECO A07):
1.g3 d5 2.Bg2 Nf6 3.Nf3 c6 4.0-0 Bg4 5.d3 Nbd7 6.Nbd2 e5 7.e4 (diagram). 

English Opening

English Opening, Botvinnik System (ECO A26):
1.g3 g6 2.Bg2 Bg7 3.c4 e5 4.Nc3 d6 5.d3 f5 6.e4 Nf6 7.Nge2 Nc6 8.0-0 0-0 9.Nd5 (diagram'').

See also
 List of chess openings
 List of chess openings named after people

References

Bibliography

Chess openings
1962 in chess